Dereshk (also known as Derīshk) is a village in Zulachay Rural District, in the Central District of Salmas County, West Azerbaijan Province, Iran. At the 2006 census, its population was 508, in 116 families.

References 

Populated places in Salmas County